The Balatonboglár wine region, also known as the South Balaton wine region, is the only one wine region in Somogy County, Hungary. The  area consists of 37 settlements, mainly located on the southern shore of Lake Balaton, but also some near Kaposvár like Böhönye, Csurgó and Nagyberki. It is part of the greater Balaton wine region.

Approximately two-thirds of the 3200 hectare vineyards of the wine region are white grapes and the remaining are Concord grapes. Champagne production plays an important role in the area as well.

The Winemaker of the Year award has been given three times to winemakers of the region since its founding: to Vencel Garamvári in 2006, to János Konyári in 2008 and to Ottó Légli in 2010.

Settlements
The 37 settlements in the wine region are:

South Balaton, North Somogy: Andocs, Balatonberény, Balatonboglár, Balatonendréd, Balatonkeresztúr, Balatonlelle, Balatonőszöd, Balatonszabadi, Balatonszárszó, Balatonszemes, Gyugy, Hollád, Karád, Kéthely, Kőröshegy, Kötcse, Látrány, Lengyeltóti, Marcali, Ordacsehi, Somogysámson, Somogytur, Somogyzsitfa, Szólád, Szőlősgyörök, Teleki, Visz, Zamárdi

The area of Nagyberki: Csoma, Kaposhomok, Kaposkeresztúr, Kercseliget, Mosdós, Nagyberki, Szabadi

Other: Böhönye, Csurgó

See also
 Hungarian wine
 Balaton wine region

References

Wine regions of Hungary
Lake Balaton
Somogy County